This is a list of television programs formerly or currently broadcast on Cartoon Network's nighttime programming block, Adult Swim in the United States. Although both entities share the same channel space, Adult Swim is classified as a separate network for the purposes of Nielsen ratings.

Current programming

Original programming

Animation

Live-action

Syndicated programming

Online programming

Upcoming programming

Original programming

Former programming

Original programming

Animation

Live-action

Syndicated programming

† – Denotes Toonami program that previously ran on Adult Swim Action/AcTN (2002–12)

Online programming

Stunts and cross-promotional programming

Pilots and specials

Pilots

Original specials
For special programming released under the "Infomercials" banner, please see Infomercials.

Syndicated shorts/specials

Films

See also
 List of programs broadcast by Cartoon Network
 List of programs broadcast by Cartoonito
 List of programs broadcast by Toonami
 List of programs broadcast by Boomerang

Notes

References

External links 
 

Adult Swim
 
Lists of programming blocks
Cartoon Network-related lists